Lefèvre-Utile Point is a point  west of Curie Point along the north side of Doumer Island, in the Palmer Archipelago, Antarctica. It was discovered and named by the French Antarctic Expedition, 1903–05, under Jean-Baptiste Charcot.

References

External links

Headlands of the Palmer Archipelago